These are lists of active and all-time National Hockey League (NHL) franchise post-season appearance, post-season series win, Stanley Cup Finals and Stanley Cup streaks up to and including the 2021–22 NHL season and subsequent 2022 Stanley Cup playoffs. These lists do not include the canceled 2004–05 NHL season.

Longest active streaks

Post-season appearance streaks

A post-season appearance streak is continued by making the NHL playoffs in consecutive years after the regular season. Since the first round of the playoffs normally consists of eight series, there will always be sixteen teams in this list (of the thirty-two teams in the NHL). 

 Did not make it past the qualifying round in the 2019-2020 season.

Post-season opening round series win streaks

This is a list of teams that have active post-season series win streaks. A post-season series win streak is continued by making the post-season and winning at least the first round series of the playoffs. Since the first round of the playoffs consists of sixteen teams in eight series, there will always be eight teams in this list, the winners of those series.

Longest all-time streaks

Post-season appearance streaks

This section has been updated to include teams who appeared in the 2022 Stanley Cup playoffs.

1 The Bruins' 29 consecutive is the second longest post-season streak in North American major professional sports history, and the longest of the "Big 4". This compares to the CFL's Edmonton Elks (then named the Eskimos) 37 consecutive, the NBA's Syracuse Nationals/Philadelphia 76ers and San Antonio Spurs 22 consecutive, the MLB's Atlanta Braves 14 consecutive, the MLS' Seattle Sounders FC 12 consecutive, and the NFL's New England Patriots 11 consecutive.
2 The nickname of the Chicago team was the "Black Hawks" for the majority of the streak – 17 of the 28 seasons. They were renamed the "Blackhawks" in 1986.
3 The Montreal Canadiens only missed the playoffs once – by a tie-breaker – in the 46 seasons from 1948–49 to 1993–94. In the 1969–70 season, they tied for fourth and last playoff spot with the New York Rangers, but were eliminated on total goals scored tiebreak (they scored 244 goals to New York's 246).
4 Includes 5 seasons as the Atlanta Flames (1975–76 through 1979–80), and 11 seasons as the Calgary Flames (1980–81 through 1990–91)
5 The Edmonton Oilers streak is the longest run from the NHL debut of a franchise, starting from the first year they were in the NHL (1979–80); although they aren't included in the NHL streak, they also made the WHA playoffs the preceding 4 seasons (1975–76 through 1978–79), for a streak of 17 consecutive playoff appearances in major professional hockey.
6 Includes 1 season as the Quebec Nordiques (1994–95), and 10 seasons as the Colorado Avalanche (1995–96 through 2005–06)
7 No post season occurred in 2005 due to the season long NHL lockout.

Post-season series win streaks
Consecutive seasons with at least one series victory.

Stanley Cup Finals appearance streaks

Stanley Cup win streaks

1 Not the current Ottawa franchise. This franchise, an original member of the NHL, folded following the 1934–35 NHL season after playing one year as the St. Louis Eagles.

See also
List of NHL franchise post-season droughts
List of Stanley Cup appearances
List of Stanley Cup champions
List of Major League Baseball franchise postseason streaks
List of NBA franchise post-season streaks
List of current National Football League consecutive playoff appearances

References

Notes

Post-season streaks
NHL
Post-season streaks
Post-season streaks